Cağaloğlu is a quarter located in the Fatih district of Istanbul, Turkey. Much of the publishing industry in Istanbul is located in Cağaloğlu. It is also famous for its ancient hamam, or Turkish bath, known as the Cağaloğlu Hamam.

Name
The quarter gets its name from Cigalazade Yusuf Sinan Pasha (c. 1545–1605), an Ottoman admiral and statesman of Genoese descent, as well as a member of the influential Cicala family of Genoa. The original name Cigalaoğlu (meaning "of the Cigala (Cicala) family", or literally "Cigala-son" as a Turkified surname) eventually turned into Cağaloğlu through the course of centuries.

Notable buildings
Cağaloğlu Anadolu Lisesi, formerly Istanbul Girls' High School, established in 1850
Cağaloğlu Hamam, a historic public bath from 1741
Istanbul Governor's Office, 1756-built, former headquarters of Ottoman Government
Istanbul High School, established in the 1880s
Nallı Masjid, 19th century small mosque
Rüstem Pasha Medrese, a historic religious institution from 1551

References

 

Quarters of Fatih